Hugh Popham (15 May 1920 – 30 June 1996) was a British poet and author.

Selected works

References

British writers
1920 births
1996 deaths
Alumni of Corpus Christi College, Cambridge
People educated at Repton School